The 1940 UC Santa Barbara Gauchos football team represented Santa Barbara State College—now known as the University of California, Santa Barbara as a member of the California Collegiate Athletic Association (CCAA) during the 1940 college football season. Led by Spud Harder in his seventh and final season as head coach, Santa Barbara State compiled an overall record of 5–5 with a mark of 0–3 in conference play, placing last out of four teams in the CCAA. The Gauchos played home games at La Playa Stadium in Santa Barbara, California.

Schedule

Notes

References

Santa Barbara State
UC Santa Barbara Gauchos football seasons
Santa Barbara State Gauchos football